TCDD MT5300 was a series of diesel multiple units operated by the Turkish State Railways. The trains were used on intercity services, and offered higher speeds and comfort than steam powered trains. There had many similarities to the MT5200. The motor units were built by MAN, Esslingen and Duewag with MAN Diesel engines, while the centre cars were built by Westwaggon.

External links
 Trains on Turkey page on MT5300

Diesel multiple units of Turkey
Duewag multiple units